Graydon may refer to:

 Graydon (name), a list of people with the name

Places
 Graydon Hall, neighbourhood in Toronto, Ontario, Canada
 Graydon Hill, Edmonton, future neighbourhood in Edmonton, Alberta, Canada
 Graydon Springs, Missouri, unincorporated community in Polk County, Missouri

See also
 Grayson (disambiguation)
 John Graydon (disambiguation)